The Fifth Missile is a 1986 television movie starring Robert Conrad, Sam Waterston and David Soul about an American ballistic missile submarine, based on the novel The Gold Crew by Frank M. Robinson and Thomas N. Scortia. With the exception of Cmdr. Van Meer, the ship's crew goes slowly insane due to exposure to paint chemicals onboard and believes a missile test exercise is, in fact, nuclear war. It explores the inability of U.S. command structures to control and prevent rogue submarine officers from launching ballistic missiles.

Cast
Robert Conrad – Cmdr. Mark Van Meer
Sam Waterston – Capt. Allard Renslow
Richard Roundtree – Cmdr. Frederick Bryce
Jonathan Banks – Ray Olson
Art LaFleur – "Animal" Meslinsky
Dennis Holahan – Warden
Sergio Fantoni – Pietro
Yvette Mimieux – Cheryl Leary
David Soul – Capt. Kevin Harris
Ed Bishop – Admiral Stewart Cullinane
William Berger – Dr. Strickland

External links 
 
 

1986 television films
1986 films
NBC network original films
Cold War submarine films
Films directed by Larry Peerce
Italian television films
English-language Italian films
Films scored by Pino Donaggio
Films about World War III
1980s English-language films